Robert "Bob" Wiltfong (born November 26, 1969) is an American actor and comedian best known for his work as a correspondent on The Daily Show on Comedy Central, as well as appearances on Chappelle's Show and Late Night with Conan O'Brien. Wiltfong was a true-life newscaster for 10 years, making him the first correspondent in  Daily Show history to have worked as a traditional news reporter. In an interview, Wiltfong revealed that he decided to exit the world of non-satirical journalism after the September 11, 2001 attacks, during which he lost a close friend, cameraman Glen Pettit.

Wiltfong has won 4 regional, individual Emmys for television performance and has been nominated for 14 others. He was part of The Daily Show's 2004 winning submission for the prestigious Peabody Award and was featured on the election year wrap up DVD put out by Comedy Central. He was a member of Neutrino, an improv comedy team in New York City. Additionally, Wiltfong has been featured in national commercials for AOL, Microsoft, Staples, Domino's Pizza and other corporate interests.

In 2010, Wiltfong was selected to star in a national ad campaign for Nationwide Insurance, playing the Nationwide spokesman in a series of nationally broadcast television commercials that  aired throughout 2010.

References

External links

Bob Wiltfong :: Actor, Writer, Comedian Official site
Fong-O-Rama Bob's Official Fanlisting

1969 births
Living people
American male comedians
American male television actors
Male actors from Omaha, Nebraska
Comedians from Nebraska
21st-century American comedians